989 is the area code for Central Michigan, the northeastern Lower Peninsula, and portions of the Thumb. It is the highest-numbered area code in use in the North American Numbering Plan (NANP), as well as the highest possible under the current system, in which a middle digit of 9 is forbidden.

Service area 
Major cities and towns in the 989 region include:

 Alma
 Alpena
 Bad Axe
 Bay City
 Caro
 Clare
 Gaylord
 Grayling
 Houghton Lake
 Midland
 Mt. Pleasant
 Owosso
 Saginaw
 St. Johns
 Tawas City
 West Branch
 Westphalia

History 
The 989 region split off from area code 517 in 2001.  Before then, 517 had served most of the eastern half of the Lower Peninsula (except the southeast) for 54 years and had been the only one of Michigan's three original area codes to have never been split.

Prior to October 2021, area code 989 had telephone numbers assigned for the central office code 988. In 2020, 988 was designated nationwide as a dialing code for the National Suicide Prevention Lifeline, which created a conflict for exchanges that permit seven-digit dialing. This area code was therefore scheduled to transition to ten-digit dialing by October 24, 2021.

References

External links
 Map of Michigan area codes
 List of exchanges from AreaCodeDownload.com, 989 Area Code

989
989
Central Michigan
Northern Michigan